Nogometni klub Turnišče, commonly referred to as NK Turnišče or simply Turnišče, is a Slovenian football club from Turnišče. The club was founded in 1941.

Honours

Slovenian Fifth Division
 Winners: 2007–08

References

External links
Worldfootball profile

Association football clubs established in 1941
Football clubs in Slovenia
1941 establishments in Yugoslavia